The 1912 Georgetown Blue and Gray football team represented Georgetown University during the 1912 college football season. Led by Frank Gargan in his first year as head coach, the team went 8–1 and won a South Atlantic Intercollegiate Athletic Association (SAIAA) championship.

Quarterback Harry Costello was an All-Southern selection.

Schedule

References

Georgetown
Georgetown Hoyas football seasons
South Atlantic Intercollegiate Athletic Association football champion seasons
Georgetown Blue and Gray football